Shalgeh (also Romanized as Shālgeh) is a village in Gavork-e Sardasht Rural District, in the Central District of Sardasht County, West Azerbaijan Province, Iran. At the 2006 census, its population was 71, in 10 families.

References 

Populated places in Sardasht County